Kevin G. Welner (born December 26, 1963) is professor of education at the University of Colorado Boulder School of Education, where he chairs the Educational Foundations Policy and Practice program area. He co-founded and is Director of the National Education Policy Center. He has authored or edited 11 books and more than 100 articles and book chapters concerning education policy and law.

Education and Career
Welner received a B.A. from University of California-Santa Barbara, a J.D. at UCLA School of Law, and a Ph.D. from UCLA Graduate School of Education & Information Studies. During his early career he received a National Academy of Education/Spencer Post-Doctoral Fellowship.

Welner joined the faculty of the University of Colorado Boulder School of Education in 1999 as an Assistant Professor. He became a Professor in 2009. where he serves as a professor of educational foundation policy and practice.

In 2014, Welner co-founded the Schools of Opportunity awards project, which seeks to "highlight public high schools that actively seek to close opportunity gaps."

Recognition (awards/honors)

In 2012, Welner was inducted as an American Educational Research Association Fellow. Welner is notable for making technical research documents that are accessible to the general public, and for participating in public academic debates on education reform issues such as standardized testing and school choice. Other awards and recognitions include:

 Outstanding Public Communication of Education Research Award, American Educational Research Association, 2017
 Early Career Award, American Educational Research Association, 2006
 Palmer O. Johnson Memorial Award, American Educational Research Association, 2005
 Spencer Fellows, conferred by National Academy of Education, 2000

Views and Research
Welner has studied the public right to education, tracking, school vouchers, school choice, educational equity, and the use of research.

Vouchers and School Choice 
In 2005, Welner conducted research on school vouchers as a resident of the Rockefeller Foundation Bellagio Center. That research was later published as a major work on school vouchers, NeoVouchers: The Emergence of Tuition Tax Credits for Private Schooling. The book provided an early explanation of the legal and policy issues surrounding a then-new type of private school vouchers. These neo-vouchers were created by giving large tax credits for donations to organizations that then packaged those donations as vouchers to fund tuition. Welner's work on school choice is employed and reviewed in several publications.

Bibliography

References

External links 
 
 
 

Living people
People from Boulder, Colorado
University of Colorado faculty
1963 births
Educational researchers